The Seigneurie de Beaupré Wind Farms, also known as just the Seigneurie de Beaupré, is a wind farm complex located in the La Côte-de-Beaupré Regional County Municipality of Quebec, Canada. The original "Seigneurie 2 & 3" wind farm was developed by Boralex and Gaz Métro in 2013.

Description
Seigneurie de Beaupré is composed of three adjacent wind farms that operate as single unit. Wind farms 2, 3, and 4 are under the co-ownership of Boralex and Gaz Métro while the "Côte-de-Beaupré" wind farm is co-owned by Boralex and the La Côte-de-Beaupré Regional County Municipality.
The wind farm complex has undergone multiple expansions, the most recent being the 23.5 MW Phase III expansion completed in 2015.

Wind farm "SBx", a proposed expansion of the Seigneurie de Beaupré wind farm complex, would increase its installed capacity by another 300 MW to 663.5 MW.

See also
 List of wind farms in Canada
 List of largest power stations in Canada

References

Wind farms in Quebec